Muden is a township on the Mooi River, 24 km northwest of Greytown and 38 km south-east of Weenen. It was established by the missionary Reverend Heinrich Röttcher and named after Müden  in Hanover, Germany, whence he came.

Agriculture
An irrigation scheme in the area waters large citrus orchards. Muden also is the furthest east location where San rock art can be found.

Sources
 Erasmus, B.P.J. (1995). Op Pad in Suid-Afrika. Jonathan Ball Uitgewers. .
 Rosenthal, Eric (1967). Ensiklopedie van Suidelike Afrika.

References

Populated places in the Umvoti Local Municipality